Belinda Bromilow (born 21 May 1975) is an Australian actress. She is known for her roles in the Nine Network series, Doctor Doctor (2016–2021), and the Hulu series, The Great (2020–present).

Education 
Bromilow studied acting at the Western Australian Academy of Performing Arts.

Career 
Bromilow has appeared in a number of Australian television series, including Mcleod's Daughters, Packed to the Rafters, and Rake. She played Jonquil Payne as a series regular on Spirited from 2010 to 2011. In 2016 Bromilow joined the main cast of Doctor Doctor as Betty Bell. She appeared in every episode of the series. In film, Bromilow has had roles in The Rage in Placid Lake and Not Suitable for Children. 

Bromilow gained greater recognition outside of Australia through her role as Aunt Elizabeth in the Hulu series The Great. She unsuccessfully auditioned for a part in the 2008 Sydney Theatre Company production of the original play upon which the series is based.

Personal life 
She is married to Australian director, playwright and screenwriter, Tony McNamara. They began their relationship in 2005. Together they have two children. Bromilow is a stepmother to McNamara's daughter from a previous marriage. She was diagnosed with bowel cancer ten weeks after her son was born. 

In 2019, Bromilow auctioned a pair of earrings she wore to the 91st Academy Awards valued at $8,950. The earrings were designed by her friend, jewellery designer, Nicole Winkler. All proceeds from the auction were donated to the Australian organization, Mummy's Wish, helping families of women diagnosed with cancer.

Filmography

References

External links

Australian television actresses
Living people
1975 births
21st-century Australian actresses